is a former badminton player from Japan.

Career
Nakanishi played the 2007 BWF World Championships in men's singles, and was defeated in the second round by Sony Dwi Kuncoro, of Indonesia, 21-15, 21-16.

External links
BWF Player Profile

References

Japanese male badminton players
1979 births
Living people